Zelenyi Hai is a village in Volnovakha Raion of Donetsk Oblast in eastern Ukraine.

Demographics
Native language as of the Ukrainian Census of 2001:
 Ukrainian 70.89%
 Russian 29.11%

References

Villages in Volnovakha Raion